John Read was a British physicist and inventor. He developed a rotating doubler electrostatic generator, used to produce static electricity, which he called a 'spectacle doubler' because it involved discs of glass. His work was based on William Nicholson's doubler.

Reid lived in Knightsbridge, London and taught at the Knightsbridge Charity School.

He made observations of the atmospheric electric field, which he observed behaved differently in different air quality conditions, in 1791 and 1792. This phenomenon is now understood as originating from the global electric circuit.

Richard Lovett was the first British academic to publish Read's letters after his death.

See also 
 Tiberius Cavallo
 Jean Nicolas Pierre Hachette
 Charles Bernard Desormes

References

British physicists
18th-century British scientists
Year of birth missing
Year of death missing